Marmosets are New World monkeys in the genus Callithrix.

Marmoset may also refer to:
 Delacour's marmoset rat, a rodent
 Marmoset (band), an American indie rock band
 Marmoset (music agency), an American independent music agency
 Marmoset rat, a rodent
 Marmousets, counselors to Charles VI of France

See also
 Marmozets, an English math rock band